Juan José Arbolí y Acaso (1795–1863) was a Spanish priest, writer and essayist. He was bishop of Guadix and Cádiz as well as a professor of philosophy.

Main works
Tratado de Filosofía, Gramática general y Exposición a su Majestad la Reina sobre circulares del Gobierno referentes a la censura eclesiástica y a la predicación. (: Discourse on Philosophy, General Grammar and Exposition to Her Majesty the Queen on government circulars relating to ecclesiastical censorship and preaching).

19th-century Spanish writers
19th-century male writers
People from Cádiz
1795 births
1863 deaths